Joanne Loraine "Jo" Jennings (formerly Steele; born 20 September 1969 in Pakenham, Suffolk) is a female retired high jumper from England.

Athletics career
Jennings twice competed for Great Britain at the Summer Olympics and won silver at the 1998 Commonwealth Games in Kuala Lumpur. She set her personal best (1.94 metres) at the IAAF World Indoor Championships in Toronto in 1993, where she finished ninth.

She represented England in the high jump event, at the 1990 Commonwealth Games in Auckland, New Zealand. Eight years later she represented England and won a silver medal, at the 1998 Commonwealth Games in Kuala Lumpur, Malaysia.

Personal life
She  a Development Manager at British Athletics.

International competitions

Note: Results with a Q, indicate overall position in qualifying round.

References

External links 
 
 

1969 births
Living people
Sportspeople from Bury St Edmunds
British female high jumpers
English female high jumpers
Olympic athletes of Great Britain
Athletes (track and field) at the 1988 Summer Olympics
Athletes (track and field) at the 1992 Summer Olympics
Commonwealth Games silver medallists for England
Commonwealth Games medallists in athletics
Athletes (track and field) at the 1990 Commonwealth Games
Athletes (track and field) at the 1998 Commonwealth Games
World Athletics Championships athletes for Great Britain
Medallists at the 1998 Commonwealth Games